Club Deportivo Turón is a football team based in the parish of Turón in Mieres, in the autonomous community of Asturias. Founded in 1925, the team plays in Regional Preferente. The club's home ground is Estadio José Manuel Fernández Felgueroso, which has a capacity of 2,000 spectators.

History 

The club was created in 1925 and has spent 48 seasons in the Tercera División, being one of the teams with the most participation in this league. Its last season in the category was in 2002–03, when Turón finished in last position of Group II, with only 10 points and 111 goals against.

Season to season

48 seasons in Tercera División

Notable players
 Adrián Colunga
 José Antonio Redondo
 José Carrete de Julián
 Jorge David López Fernández

External links
Futbolme profile 
Arefepedia profile 

Football clubs in Asturias
Association football clubs established in 1925
1925 establishments in Spain
Divisiones Regionales de Fútbol clubs